Burr Churchill Miller (September 16, 1870 - January 14, 1925), known professionally as Burr C. Miller, was an American sculptor remembered for his memorial statues of General Nicholas Herkimer in Herkimer, New York and Thomas Brackett Reed in Portland, Maine. He was born in Herkimer, New York, the son of Senator Warner Miller, died in Wilkes-Barre, Pennsylvania, and is buried in the Oak Hill Cemetery in Herkimer. Miller was a student of Paul Wayland Bartlett and won an Honorable Mention in the Paris Salon of 1907.

References 

 Ilion Citizen, July 27, 1900, page 6
 San Francisco Call, Volume 87, Number 136, 15 April 1902
 American Art Directory, Volume 10, R.R. Bowker, 1913
 
 Geni.com entry
 Public Art Portland: Thomas Brackett Reed
 Installation of the Gen. Nicholas Herkimer Monument
 History of the Mohawk Valley: Gateway to the West 1614-1925, ed. Nelson Greene, Chicago: The S. J. Clarke Publishing Company, 1925, Vol. II, p. 1783

19th-century American sculptors
1870 births
1925 deaths
People from Herkimer, New York
20th-century American sculptors
Sculptors from New York (state)